Bürkli may refer to:

 Arnold Bürkli (1833–1899), an engineer from Switzerland
 Arnold Bürkli Memorial, a sculpture at the Arboretum Zürich which is dedicated to Arnold Bürkli
 Bürkliplatz Zürich, a public square in Zürich named for Arnold Bürkli
 Bürkliterrasse, a section of the Quaianlagen named for Arnold Bürkli